The Green Line is a light rail line in Santa Clara County, California, and part of the Santa Clara Valley Transportation Authority (VTA) light rail system. It serves 26 stations in the cities of Santa Clara, San Jose, and Campbell, traveling between Old Ironsides and Winchester stations. The line connects Levi's Stadium, San Jose International Airport (via a bus connection), Downtown San Jose, San Jose State University, SAP Center, and Diridon station. It runs for 20 hours per day on weekdays, with headways of 15 minutes for most of the day. On weekends, train run at 20 minute headways for most of the day. After around 8pm on weekdays and weekends trains run at 30 minute headways.

Route description
The Green Line starts from the Old Ironsides station in Santa Clara, where it shares service with the Orange Line. Traveling eastwards on Tasman Drive, the Green Line passes Levi's Stadium and the future Related Santa Clara mega-development. At First Street, it turns south and shares tracks with the Blue Line to downtown San Jose. After the Convention Center stop, it leaves the shared portion of the tracks and heads southwest to the Winchester station in southern Campbell, with a stop at Caltrain and Amtrak's Diridon Station. The whole route takes approximately one hour.

Owl service
From February 2000 to April 14, 2003, VTA operated all night train service with light rail vehicles (commonly known as "owl service") on a 70-minute frequency between Mountain View and Baypointe. At the time, VTA light rail was the only light rail service in the United States to operate 24 hours a day. The owl service was curtailed in 2003 as a result of mounting deficits.

Construction history
The route that the Mountain View–Winchester line now runs on is constructed in three different expansion projects: the original Guadalupe line, the Tasman West extension, and the Vasona extension.

Guadalupe line
The trackway between Woz Way in Downtown San Jose and Old Ironsides station is part of the Guadalupe line, the first light rail line constructed in Santa Clara county.  The Guadalupe line opened for revenue service on December 11, 1987 originally running from Old Ironsides station to Civic Center station in San Jose.  Champion station was not part of the original line; it was added as intermediate stop as part of the Tasman West project.

Service on this line was gradually expanded south from Civic Center station as follows:
Service through the downtown mall and onward to the Convention Center station began on July 17, 1988.
Service between Convention Center and Tamien stations began on August 17, 1990.
Service between Tamien and Santa Teresa stations began on April 25, 1991.

Tasman West extension
The Tasman West extension project added the following features to the line as follows:
Champion station added as an infill stop along the existing Guadalupe line trackway (Station opened March 24, 1997).
 of trackway and 12 new light rail stations added between the existing Old Ironsides station and the new Downtown Mountain View station. (Opened December 17, 1999.)
Baypointe station added just east of the intersection of 1st and Tasman.  (Opened December 17, 1999.)
Baypointe station is no longer served by this line due to a line reconfiguration implemented in August 2005.
After the completion of Tasman West extension and before the completion of Tasman East/Capitol and Vasona extensions, VTA split the light rail system into two main lines: one line running between Baypointe and Downtown Mountain View, the other between Baypointe and Santa Teresa.  Passengers transferred between the two lines at the new Baypointe station. Tasman is now the transfer station.

Tasman West extension was constructed with funds from 1996 Measure B sales tax measure.

Vasona extension
Mountain View–Winchester contains the entire Vasona extension from San Fernando station to the southern line terminal, Winchester station, . Vasona extension opened for revenue service on October 1, 2005. It was originally scheduled to open two months earlier on August 1 but was delayed due to a dispute between Federal Railroad Administration and VTA.  At issue was whether a waiver was needed from FRA, since the Union Pacific branchline that parallels most of Vasona extension is still actively used on a tri-weekly basis to serve the Permanente Quarry cement plant in the Cupertino Foothills and a lumber yard in Campbell.  A waiver was finally obtained on the condition that all light rail vehicles sound their horns at crossings until "Quiet Zone" improvements are implemented. Freight trains are still required to sound their horns. The Vasona extension was also constructed with funds from 1996 Measure B sales tax measure.

Light Rail Efficiency Project 
In 2014, a new storage track and crossover was constructed between Old Ironsides and Reamwood as part of improvements to support events at Levi's Stadium and the future Silicon Valley BART extension.

To provide better headways and service reliability, a second track was constructed between Whisman and Downtown Mountain View. Work began in summer 2014 and was completed in late 2015. Evelyn Station was permanently closed in mid-March 2015 as part of track construction.

2019 reconfiguration
Upon the opening of the Silicon Valley BART extension to Berryessa / North San Jose, Line 902 will be split into the Green Line (Old Ironsides -Winchester) and the Orange Line (Mountain View - Alum Rock). As of early 2019, station signage has begun to reflect the future configuration, displaying line colors rather than terminus icons.

Station stops

Station facilities
Many stations along this line have park-and-ride lots (labeled as ), as well as bike stations (labeled as ), including:

 Lick Mill (at Great America Station)
 River Oaks   — also the stop for VTA headquarters
 San Fernando 
 San Jose Diridon  
 Bascom  
 Winchester

References

External links

 VTA Site Route Information 

Santa Clara Valley Transportation Authority light rail lines